George E. Molinaro (October 1, 1902September 29, 1978) was an American businessman and politician.  He was the 74th Speaker of the Wisconsin State Assembly.  A Democrat, he served a total of 30 years in the Assembly, representing Kenosha, Wisconsin, and was a member of the Democratic Assembly caucus leadership for many years.  He was also one of the charter members of UAW Local 72 in Kenosha, and was involved in the leadership of that Local for more than a decade.

Early life and career
Born in Kenosha, Wisconsin, Molinaro was educated in the Kenosha public schools and attended the Kenosha Business College before going to work as an auto worker and production inspector at the Nash Motors plant in Kenosha.  There, he became involved with the United Auto Workers union and was one of the charter members of Kenosha's UAW Local 72.  He served four years as vice president of Local 72, and was a member of the executive committee for twelve years.  Molinaro worked at Nash Motors through its transition to American Motors Corporation, and retired from American Motors after 45 years of labor in 1965.

Political career
Molinaro made his first attempt at elected office in 1937, running unsuccessfully for the Kenosha County Board of Supervisors.  He ran again in 1939, this time winning the seat.  He ultimately served on the county board through 1947.

In 1946, Molinaro launched a primary challenge against incumbent state representative Matt G. Siebert.  In the August primary, Molinaro narrowly defeated Siebert, taking 53% of the vote.  Siebert, however, after losing the primary chose to run as an independent.  Molinaro prevailed with 46% in the general election over Siebert and Republican candidate George E. Mahoney.  Two years later, in 1948, Siebert returned to run as a Republican; Molinaro defeated him for a third time.  Molinaro was subsequently reelected another thirteen times.

In the Assembly, Molinaro served in several leadership positions in the Democratic caucus.  He was Democratic minority leader for the 1951–1952 and 1953–1954 sessions, was chosen as Speaker of the Wisconsin State Assembly when the Democrats held the Assembly majority in the 74th Wisconsin Legislature (1959–1960), was speaker pro tempore for 1965–1966 session, and was Democratic caucus chairman for the 1961–1962, 1963–1964, and 1967–1968 sessions.  He was, for several sessions, chairman of the Assembly Rules Committee, and was a member or chairman of the powerful Joint Finance Committee for nearly his entire Assembly career.

One of his chief accomplishments in the Wisconsin Legislature was the passage of a series of laws in 1965 which established two new branches of the University of Wisconsin System—University of Wisconsin–Parkside and University of Wisconsin–Green Bay.  He had worked for years to establish a University of Wisconsin branch in the Kenosha–Racine area.  In recognition for his efforts to establish the branch and for his efforts to support funding for higher education in the state, UW–Parkside made him an honorary alumnus, and University of Wisconsin awarded him an honorary doctorate.

Later years
In 1961, while serving in the Legislature, Molinaro became involved in the founding of American State Bank in Kenosha.  He served as the first president of the bank and was then chairman of the bank until his death in 1978.

Personal life and legacy
Molinaro was a first generation Italian American.  His parents, Raffaele (Ralph) and Teresa Molinaro (née Marano), had immigrated to the United States from the province of Cosenza in the Kingdom of Italy.  He had nine brothers and sisters, including television actor Al Molinaro and Kenosha County district attorney Joseph Molinaro.

George Molinaro married Madeleine R. Jensen on March 2, 1946, at Kenosha's Holy Rosary Catholic Church.

Molinaro was a frequent smoker and was rarely seen without a cigar or cigarette.  He died at age 76 at University of Wisconsin Hospital in Madison, Wisconsin, after suffering from cancer and emphysema for several months.

After his death, University of Wisconsin–Parkside named a major building complex George Molinaro Hall in his honor.

Electoral history

Wisconsin Assembly, Kenosha 2nd district (1946–1952)

Wisconsin Assembly, Kenosha 1st district (1954–1970)

Wisconsin Assembly, 64th district (1972, 1974)

References

External links
 Molinaro, George 1902 at Wisconsin Historical Society
 Campus Map at University of Wisconsin–Parkside
 1965 Wisconsin Act 259

|-

|-
 

|-

Politicians from Kenosha, Wisconsin
Businesspeople from Wisconsin
County supervisors in Wisconsin
Members of the Wisconsin State Assembly
Speakers of the Wisconsin State Assembly
1902 births
1978 deaths
20th-century American politicians
20th-century American businesspeople
United Auto Workers people